The Daytime Emmy Award for Outstanding Drama Series Writing Team is an award presented annually by the National Academy of Television Arts and Sciences (NATAS) and Academy of Television Arts & Sciences (ATAS). It was first awarded at the 1st Daytime Emmy Awards ceremony, held in 1974, and it is given to honor the performances of the entire writing team participating in a form of a daytime drama.

The award was previously called Outstanding Writing for a Drama Series between 1974 and 1986, where the category had various names and honored different members of the writing team. Therefore, since then, the category began to start using its current title years.  The Emmy was named after an "Immy," an affectionate term used to refer to the image orthicon camera tube. The statuette was designed by Louis McManus, who modeled the award after his wife, Dorothy. The Emmy statuette is fifteen inches tall from base to tip, weighs five pounds and is composed of iron, pewter, zinc and gold.

The Young and the Restless holds the record for most wins with nine.  The Young and the Restless have also received the most nominations, with a total of twenty-seven. ABC has been the network the most successful, with a total of eighteen wins. In 1997, All My Children and The Young and the Restless tied, which was the first tie in this category.  

As of the 2022 ceremony, Days of Our Lives is the most recent recipient of the award.

Winners and nominees
Listed below are the winners of the award for each year, as well as the other nominees.

1970s

1980s

1990s

2000s

2010s

2020s

Total awards won

Notes

References

External links
 

Awards established in 1974
1974 establishments in the United States
Daytime Emmy Awards
Screenwriting awards for television